This is a list of number-one songs in 1983 on the Italian charts compiled weekly by the Italian Hit Parade Singles Chart compiled weekly by the FIMI.

Chart history

Songs

Number-one artists

Songs

References

1983
1983 in Italian music
1983 record charts